Gambler is a musical written by Eric Woolfson. It features several of his most popular songs from his earlier writing with The Alan Parsons Project. It is loosely based on the Project album The Turn of a Friendly Card, although it also contains several newly written songs as well as two songs from later albums, and doesn't include many songs from the 1980 album (unlike had been the case with Gaudi).

Plot

The plot, inspired by Dostoyevsky's 1866 novel The Gambler, involves a young man entering the Peking Palace Casino and becoming a serious gambler in order to win the affection of a showgirl there, both of whom are being manipulated by the casino boss.

Production
Gambler the musical had world premier and was created in October 1996 at stadttheater in Mönchengladbach, Germany, and it ran October 1996 till June 1998; it was staged in 1999 in Seoul, South Korea.

Album release

The recording of the German cast was released as a CD in 1997 (with the subtitle "Das Geheimnis der Karten", lit. "the secret of the cards"). It is currently out of print, but is available as a digital download from Woolfson's official website.

Track listing
All songs written and composed by Eric Woolfson.

"Fanfare" (0:30)
"Green Light Means Danger" (7:01)
"Love In The Third Degree" (4:14)
"When The World Was Young" (6:14)
"Games People Play" (5:21)
"The Golden Key" (4:49)
"Limelight" (7:11)
"9 x 9 x 9" (4:40)
"Halfway" (5:10)
"Eye in the Sky" (9:01)
"(You'll be) Far Away" (4:21)
"Time" (7:19)
"Medley" (0:55)
"Afterture" (bonus track to the download version)

References

External links
 Gambler - Eric Woolfson official website
 

1997 albums
1997 musicals
Adaptations of works by Fyodor Dostoyevsky
Eric Woolfson albums
Concept albums
Musicals based on novels